The Nouveau Larousse illustré (New Larousse Illustrated) was an illustrated French language encyclopedia published by Éditions Larousse between 1897 and 1904, in 7 volumes and a supplement. It was essentially a scaled-down version of the Grand dictionnaire universel du XIXe siècle (Great universal dictionary of the 19th century) of Pierre Larousse, but updated and written in a more neutral, scientific style under the editorship of Claude Augé (1854−1924).

The encyclopedia consisted of 7,600 pages containing 237,000 articles, with 49,000 black and white illustrations, over 500 maps and 89 colour plates.

See also 
Éditions Larousse
Grand dictionnaire universel du XIXe siècle, 1866–1876 encyclopedia with 1877 and 1890 supplements
Grand Larousse encyclopédique, 1960-1964 encyclopedia with later supplements

References

External links 
 
 Online copies of Nouveau Larousse illustré (1897-1904) at the Internet Archive:

French encyclopedias
French dictionaries
19th-century French literature
1897 books
Éditions Larousse books
19th-century encyclopedias
20th-century encyclopedias